Bunyaruguru was a kingdom in what is today Uganda. It became a part of the British Ankole protectorate in 1901. Bunyaruguru is one of the counties in Uganda endowed with many natural resources; there are more crater lakes in Bunyaruguru than any other part in Uganda. Bunyaruguru has now become a district with Rubirizi as its name.

References

World Statesmen.org
The Ankole Agreement 1901

Ankole